Kimaeti is a settlement in Kenya's Bungoma County. It is in Bungoma county, located along the Bungoma Malaba road just a few minutes drive from Bungoma town center.

To the north and south of Kimaeti is Malakisi and Myanga markets respectively.
It is a popular area with its huge animal market and religious movements. Every year there is a quran completion held at kimaeti mosque for the whole of Kenya.  There are also some small churches in the area.

References 

Populated places in Western Province (Kenya)
Bungoma County